Hot yoga is a form of yoga as exercise performed under hot and humid conditions, resulting in considerable sweating. Some hot yoga practices seek to replicate the heat and humidity of India, where yoga originated. Bikram Choudhury has suggested that the heated environment of Bikram Yoga helps to prepare the body for movement and to "remove impurities".

Styles

The first style described as hot yoga is that of Bikram Choudhury, who claimed to have devised it from traditional hatha yoga techniques, but then increased the temperature of the studios while in Japan to represent the heat of India. Bikram Yoga resulted, and became popular in the early 1970s after Choudhury moved to the United States. Each class is 90 minutes long and has a fixed sequence of movements. The class ends with a two-minute shavasana (corpse pose). Bikram Yoga differs markedly from other hot yoga styles, as shown in the table.

Forrest Yoga is a style developed by Ana T. Forrest, c. 1982. The style focuses on holding poses for a longer duration. The repetition of twenty specific poses accentuates the stretch equally on each side of the body.

CorePower Yoga, founded in 2002, is a vigorous multi-disciplinary hot yoga style.

Baron Baptiste Power Yoga has the room heated somewhat less than Bikram Yoga. Baptiste, who learnt yoga from T. K. V. Desikachar and B. K. S. Iyengar as a boy, and had Indra Devi as godmother, uses a Vinyasa (flow) style, the breath linked to the movements, with emphasis on the gaze (Drishti) and the use of a lock, Uddiyana Bandha, to stabilize the core.

Moksha yoga, also known as Modo Yoga, is based on Bikram Yoga. Moksha Yoga was founded in Canada in 2004 by human rights and environmental activists Jessica Robertson and Ted Grand.

Tribalance Hot Yoga, created in Schaumburg, Illinois by Corey Kelly and Shawnda Falvo in 2007, is based on Bikram and Yin Yoga; it does not have a fixed series of asanas, and emphasises the meditational aspect of yoga.

There are also different types of hot yoga classes. There are hot yoga sculpt classes, hot yoga barre, hot yin yoga, hot 26 & 2 yoga, and hot yoga fushion. There have been studies that have found that yoga can be an effective way to treat symptoms of depression.

Experience

The travel writer Elizabeth Gowing, sampling a hot yoga class, found some poses familiar, such as Dancer (Natarajasana) and Eagle (Garudasana), and some new, such as Elephant and Cactus. She was surprised that the Corpse pose was adopted very briefly but repeatedly, rather than just as relaxation at the end of the class. She found the class tiring but stated that the elasticity of her legs had increased.

Contraindications

Exercise in high heat and humidity is a contraindication for pregnant women, as there is an increased risk of exhaustion, and hence muscle injury and cartilage and tissue damage. Hormones and fetal development affect blood pressure, making the mother also more susceptible to fainting and lightheadedness if exercising in a hot environment.

Benefits

There has been an 8 week, uncontrolled trial that assessed the efficacy of hot yoga on 51 healthy participants ages 20-54 years old. The participants varied in physical activity levels. At the end of the trial, they found that many of the participants saw a reduction in perceived stress levels.

References

Yoga styles